Wurmbea nilpinna is a species of plant in the Colchicaceae family that is endemic to South Australia.

Distribution
The species is known only from Nilpinna Station in the Davenport Range of the Lake Eyre region of South Australia.

References

nilpinna
Monocots of Australia
Flora of South Australia
Plants described in 2007
Taxa named by Robert John Bates